Chionodes theurgis is a moth in the family Gelechiidae. It is found in North America, where it has been recorded from southern Quebec, New Hampshire, southern Michigan, northern Nebraska, southern Manitoba, south-eastern Wyoming, Colorado and Arizona.

References

Chionodes
Moths described in 1999
Moths of North America